Daily Janakantha ( Dainik Janakanṭha "Daily People's Voice") is a Bengali daily newspaper published from Dhaka, Bangladesh. It is owned by Janakantha Shilpa Paribar (GJSP). This newspaper was first published on 21 February 1993. Mohammad Atikullah Khan Masud was the editor of the newspaper till his death. In 1999 Bangladesh army personnel had to defuse a landmine left at the newspaper office by suspected Islamist militants. The newspaper has a Secular to Liberal political leaning and is published in both print and online versions.

See also
List of newspapers in Bangladesh

References

External links 
Official Website
eJanakantha

Bengali-language newspapers published in Bangladesh
Daily newspapers published in Bangladesh
Newspapers published in Dhaka